The University Press of Kansas is a publisher located in Lawrence, Kansas.  Operated by the University of Kansas, it represents the six state universities in the US state of Kansas: Emporia State University, Fort Hays State University, Kansas State University (K-State), Pittsburg State University, the University of Kansas (KU), and Wichita State University.

The press was established in 1946, with major reorganizations in 1967 and 1976. Today, it operates as a consortium with representation from each of the participating universities. It is currently located on the west portion of the KU campus. The University Press of Kansas is currently a member of the Association of University Presses and has been since 1946.

History
The University Press of Kansas largely publishes works that explore American politics (including the presidency, American political thought, and public policy), military history, American history (especially political, cultural, intellectual, and western), environmental policy, American studies, film studies, law and legal history, Indigenous studies, and books about Kansas and the Midwest.

The press's specialty areas were cultivated in 1981, when then-director Fred Woodward noticed that, aside from a successful series on the US presidents, the press had published few works about political science. Woodward subsequently decided to focus on building a list of publications that explored the politics of the United States.

In 2021, leadership of the press was incorporated into the responsibilities of the dean of the University of Kansas Libraries, a position then held by Kevin Smith. In 2022, Mike Haddock, the associate dean for research, education and engagement at K-State Libraries, was appointed interim director of the press following Smith's departure from KU Libraries.

Kansas Open Books initiative
The University Press of Kansas's "Kansas Open Books" initiative is project aimed at scanning out-of-print UPK books and offer them for free download. The project is funded by the Mellon Foundation and the National Endowment for the Humanities.

Publications 
Major book series published by the University Press of Kansas include:

 "American Political Thought"
 "American Presidential Elections"
 "American Presidency"
 "Civil Military Relations"
 "Congressional Leaders"
 "Constitutional Thinking"
 "CultureAmerica"
 "Environment and Society"
 "Kansas Nature Guides"
 "Landmark Law Cases and American Society"
 "Modern First Ladies"
 "Modern War Studies"
 "Rethinking Careers, Rethinking Academia"
 "Studies in Government and Public Policy"
 "US Army War College Guides to Civil War Battles"

See also

 List of English-language book publishing companies
 List of university presses

Notes

References

External links 
 Official website
 Kansas Open Books Initiative 

Publishing companies established in 1946
Kansas
1946 establishments in Kansas